The Södermanlands Fotbollförbund (Södermanland Football Association) is one of the 24 district organisations of the Swedish Football Association. It administers lower tier football in the historical province of Södermanland.

Background 

Södermanlands Fotbollförbund, commonly referred to as Södermanlands FF, is the governing body for football in Södermanland County and some municipalities in the southern peripherical part of Stockholm County. The Association was founded on 25 March 1917 and currently has 139 member clubs.  Based in Eskilstuna, the Association's Chairman is Lars Wessman.

Affiliated Members 

The following clubs are affiliated to the Södermanlands FF:

AC Primavera
Al Salam SK
Al Salam-Eskilstuna SK
Allkurd KIF
Aspö IF
Assyriska FF
Assyriska FF Ungdom
Assyriska United FK
Baggetorps IF
Barva IF
Beachhallen BSC
Betnahrin Kulturcentrum IK
Bie GOIF
Bissarna Talang FF
Björkviks IF
Björnlunda IF
BK Sport
BK Tun
Borac IK
Broby-Bettna FC
Brunnsängs IK
Buskhyttans SK
DFK Värmbol
Dunkers IF
Ekängens BK
Enhörna IF
Enhörna TFF
Ericsbergs GOIF
Eskilstuna Babylon IF
Eskilstuna City FK
Eskilstuna Södra FF
Eskilstuna Södra TFF
Eskilstuna United DFF
FC Kringlan
FC Succé
FF Södertälje
Flens IF-Södra
Floda IF
Fogdö IF
Gåsinge-Dillnäs IF
Gillberga-Lista IF
Gnesta FC 79
Gnesta FF
Gnesta TFF
Gropptorps IF
Hällbybrunns FF
Hällbybrunns IF
Hälleforsnäs IF
Härad IF
Hargs BK
Hargs FC
Högsjö BK
Hölö-Mörkö IF
Homenetmen IF Södertälje
IF Verdandi
IFK Eskilstuna
IFK Mariefred
IFK Nyköping
IFK Strängnäs
IK Standard
IK Tun
IK Viljan Strängnäs
Internationella FC Katrineholm
Irakona International SC
Jäders IF
Järna SK
Järna SK TFF
Jönåkers IF
Julita GoIF
Kaldeiska Ishtar FF
Katrineholms AIK
Katrineholms AIK TFF
Katrineholms SK FK
Kvicksunds SK
Länna GoIF
Löthens GoIF-Fotboll
Malma FC
Malmköpings IF
Marsjö-Byle GOIF
Mellösa IF
Mölnbo IF
Näsby BK
Näshulta GOIF
Nävekvarns GOIF
New Mill Indians SK
Nyköpings BIS
Nykvarns SK
Nynäs IK
Ostra IF
Oxelösunds IK
Oxelösunds IK Ungdom
Pershagens SK
Råby/Rönö IF
Real Stars FF
Runtuna IK
Sjösa IF
Skogstorps GOIF
Sköldinge IF
Slagsta United DFF
Söder FF
Södertälje Syriska Förening
Sparreholms SK
Stallarholmens SK
Stenkvista GOIF
Stigtomta IF
Stjärnhovs IK
Stora Sundby GoIF
Strångsjö AIK
Syrianska BoIS
Syrianska Eskilstuna IF
Syrianska FC
Team Rosa SK
Telge FF
Telge United FF
Tisnarbro IF
Torshälla-Nyby IS
Torshargs BK
Triangelns FF
Triangelns IK
Trosa IF
Tystberga GIF
Vadsbro IF
Vagnhärads SK
Valla IF
Värmbols FC
Värmbols FC TFF
Västerljungs IF
Velociped-O IF Diana
Viljans FF
Vingåkers IF
Vingåkers IF TFF
Vrena IF
Åkers IF
Ålberga GIF
Ärla IF
Östermalms IS
Östertelge BOIS
Österåkers IS

League Competitions 
Södermanlands FF run the following League Competitions:

Men's Football
Division 4  -  one section
Division 5  -  two sections
Division 6  -  four sections
Division 7  -  three sections

Women's Football
Division 3  -  one section
Division 4  -  one section
Division 5  -  two sections

Footnotes

External links 
 Södermanlands FF Official Website 

Soderman
Football in Södermanland County
Sports organizations established in 1917
1917 establishments in Sweden